GG Bond (simplified Chinese: 猪猪侠; traditional Chinese: 豬豬俠) is a Chinese computer-animated fantasy television show created by Zhibin "Ben" Gu and produced by WinSing Animation. The series began in 2005 and has aired for 17 seasons in 3D computer-generated animation. The production company has distributed one season of episodes yearly since 2005.

For the 17th season, the show was completely redesigned and the characters were given new names. This revamp was developed with the help of Al Kahn, the former CEO of 4Kids Entertainment, who brought in some American writers. Starting with this season, the show was given the new English title Kung Fu Pork Choppers.

There are currently four theatrical films based on the TV series: GG Bond Hatching (2012), GG Bond 2 (2014), GG Bond Movie: Ultimate Battle (2015) and GG Bond: Guarding (2017).

Plot
The show follows the titular GG Bond, an intelligent, immature, and mischievous humanoid pig living in a world where the magic of fairy tales has coalesced with modern society. He retains a close circle of acquaintances in the fellow pigs Pheobe (菲菲), Super Q (超人强), Bobby (波比), S-Daddy (小呆呆), and Dr. Mihoo (迷糊博士). Each season follows a different iteration of this team in the series' multiverse, with only their names and broad personalities remaining consistent. These universes occasionally cross over with each other in central story arcs.

Most episodes of GG Bond are comedies with moral lessons regarding the values of courage, friendship, harmony, integrity, perseverance, and respect for elders. Environmental issues often discussed include environmental damage, deforestation, and pollution. Episodes of the series often include humorous takes on classic fairy tales with modern technology.

Kung Fu Pork Choppers 
 Hampton is the leader of the Kung Fu Pork Choppers. His superpower is super speed.
 Hamgelina is the smartest member of the team. Her superpower is the manipulation of gravity.
 Pigcasso is the fun-loving trickster of the team. His superpower is multiplying himself into clones.
 La Puerca is the tallest and strongest member of the team. Her superpower is super strength.
 Glorious P.I.G. is the team's pompous jock. His superpower is invisibility.

Villains 
 Blort is a hotheaded robot who is the commander of the Stormfront Troopers.
 Carl is Blort's sidekick, a neurotic bat-like creature who wears metal armor.
 Karnage is an eagle who is the strategist of the Stormfront Troopers.
 Foggy is a bat-like creature with the ability to create fog.

Supporting characters 
 Ziglet is a martial artist pig who trains the Kung Fu Pork Choppers.
 Swinestyn is a scientist pig who helps the Kung Fu Pork Choppers.
 Mr. Spork is Swinestyn's mechanical helper.

Reception and awards 
Winner of "Domestic Animation Golden Award" of the 17th Shanghai TV Festival.
Nominated for the 2009 "Best Domestic Animation" at Shanghai TV Festival.
Winner of the 2009 KAKU Annual "Best Animated Series" as reported by Beijing Review.

References

2005 Chinese television series debuts
2000s animated television series
2010s Chinese television series
2010s animated television series
Chinese children's animated television series
Computer-animated television series
Animated television series about pigs
Television shows adapted into films
Mandarin-language television shows